Alexander Lukasz Jogalla (born June 3, 1991), known professionally as Pico Alexander, is an American actor.

Personal life
Alexander Lukasz Jogalla was born in New York City, New York, and raised in Park Slope, Brooklyn. His parents, Magdalena Deskur and cinematographer Lukasz Jogalla, are Polish immigrants. His grandfather was actor Jerzy Jogałła, and his great-grandfather was journalist Jerzy Turowicz. His name, "Pico", is a childhood nickname. He graduated from Fiorello H. LaGuardia High School.

Career
Alexander's stage credits include Our Town, Punk Rock, and What I Did Last Summer.

He has appeared on a number of television series, including The Carrie Diaries, Alpha House, The Following, Blue Bloods, and Orange Is the New Black.

He played Elias Morales, the brother of the lead character, in A Most Violent Year (2014), and Sonny Cottler, a Jewish fraternity president, in James Schamus's Indignation (2016), opposite Logan Lerman. In 2017, he played Trey Wandella in the Netflix Original War Machine and starred as Harry, Reese Witherspoon's character's love interest, in the romantic comedy film Home Again.

In 2018, he was featured in Rockstar Games' Red Dead Redemption 2, playing Kieran Duffy, a captured member of a rival gang.

Filmography

Film

Television

Video games

References

External links

1991 births
American male film actors
American male stage actors
American male television actors
Living people
American people of Polish descent
Male actors from New York City
People from Park Slope
Fiorello H. LaGuardia High School alumni
21st-century American male actors